Route 311 is a provincial highway located in the Laurentides region of Quebec. The 77 kilometer-highway runs from south to north from the junction of Route 309 in Notre-Dame-de-Pontmain to Mont-Saint-Michel also at the junction of Highway 309. It is briefly concurrent with Route 117 at Beaux-Rivages and Lac-des-Écorces.

Municipalities along Route 311
 Notre-Dame-de-Pontmain
 Lac-du-Cerf
 Kiamika
 Val-Barrette
 Beaux-Rivages
 Lac-des-Écorces
 Chute-Saint-Philippe
 Lac-Saint-Paul
 Mont-Saint-Michel

Major intersections

See also
 List of Quebec provincial highways

References

External links
 Official Transports Quebec Road Map Network 
 Route 311 on Google Maps

311
Roads in Laurentides